The following is a timeline of the history of the city of Kathmandu, Nepal.

Prior to 20th century

1567 BCE – Kirant rule started
 1000 BCE – Swayambhunath shrine built (approximate date).
 723 CE – Kathmandu founded by Raja Gunakamedeva.
1339 – Samasuddhin attacks Nepal and loots lot of jewels
 1480 – Kathmandu becomes independent.
 1596 – Temple of Kathmandu built.
 1690 – Maju Deval built.
 1768 – Battle of Kathmandu; city taken by Gurkha forces of Prithvi Narayan Shah.
 1832 – Dharahara Tower built by Bhimsen Thapa.
 1846 – Kot massacre.
 1886 – Residence of royal family relocated from Hanuman Dhoka (Basantapur Palace) to Narayanhity Palace (now a museum).

20th century

 1901 – Gorkhapatra newspaper begins publication.
 1920
 Garden of Dreams built for Kaiser Shamsher Jang Bahadur Rana.
 Population: 108,805 metro.
 1934 – 1934 Nepal–Bihar earthquake.
 1954 – Nepali Hindi Daily newspaper begins publication.
 1956 – Central Zoo opens.
 1959 – Tribhuvan University founded in nearby Kirtipur.
 1961
 Janasewa Cinema burns down on New Road.
 Population: 122,507.
 1967 – National Museum of Nepal active.
 1970 – Narayanhity Palace rebuilt.
 1975
 24 February: Coronation of king Birendra.
 Natural History Museum of Nepal established.
 1979 – Kathmandu Valley UNESCO World Heritage Site established.
 1981 – Population: 235,160.
 1983 – Daily News English-language newspaper begins publication.
 1992
 April: Political demonstration; crackdown.
 Nepal Stock Exchange established.
 1994 – Center for Nepal Environmental and Educational Development established.

21st century

 2001
 1 June: Nepalese royal massacre.
 Population: 671,846 city; in 1,081,845 Kathmandu District.
 2007
 United Nations Mission in Nepal headquartered in Baneshwor.
 September: Bombing.
 2010 – September: 12th General Convention of the Nepali Congress held in Kathmandu.
 2011 – Population: 1,003,285; 1,744,240 in Kathmandu District.
 2015 – 25 April: The 7.8  Ghorka earthquake affected the country with a maximum Mercalli intensity of IX (Violent). Almost 9,000 people were killed in the region.

See also
 History of Kathmandu

References

This article incorporates information from the Portuguese Wikipedia.

Bibliography

External links

 Map of Kathmandu, 1985
 
 Europeana. Items related to Kathmandu, various dates.
 Digital Public Library of America. Items related to Kathmandu, various dates

 
Kathmandu
 
Years in Nepal
Kathmandu
Nepal history-related lists